The 2022 Mississippi State Bulldogs baseball team represented Mississippi State University in the 2022 NCAA Division I baseball season. The Bulldogs played their home games at Dudy Noble Field. They entered this season as the defending national champions.

Previous season

The Bulldogs finished 50–18, 20–10 in the SEC to finish in second place in the West. The Bulldogs swept the Starkville Regional and then hosted Notre Dame in the Starkville Super Regional.
They advanced to the College World Series where they defeated Vanderbilt in the Championship Series to win the program's and institution's first team national championship, as there have been individual national champions in various sports.

Schedule and results

Standings

Results

MLB Draft

Player Eligibility
The following players have used up their eligibility and will not return for the next season: Jess Davis OF, RJ Yeager INF, and Drew Talley RHP.

High School Recruits
Before any draftees are signed by their major league team, Mississippi State was ranked 6th in the nation by Perfect Game. Perfect Game ranks players nationwide as the top 500. If there is no ranking, then the player was not in the top 500. If draft is not indicated, then the player was not drafted in this years draft.

See also
2022 Mississippi State Bulldogs softball team

References

Mississippi State
Mississippi State Bulldogs baseball seasons
Mississippi State Bulldogs baseball